Michael Earl Smith (born August 10, 1965) is an American jockey who has been one of the leading riders in U.S. Thoroughbred racing since the early 1990s, was inducted into the National Museum of Racing and Hall of Fame in 2003, and has won the most Breeders' Cup races of any jockey with 27 Breeders' Cup wins.   Smith is also the third leading jockey of all time in earnings with over $336 million. In 2018, Smith rode Justify to the Triple Crown, becoming the oldest jockey to win the title at age 52.

Background
Smith was born to George Smith, a one-time jockey, and Vidoll Vallejos in New Mexico; his mother was 19 years old at the time. Smith's parents divorced when he was 8 years old. Smith spent most of his youth on his maternal grandparents' horse farm where he began breaking horses at eight years old.

Smith began riding races in his native New Mexico at age 11, and took out a jockey's license at age 16 in 1982. In the ninth grade, Smith dropped out of Dexter High School. Shortly thereafter, accompanied by his paternal grandfather, he began riding a Midwestern circuit which included races at Hawthorne Race Course in Chicago, Ak-Sar-Ben in Omaha and Oaklawn Park Race Track in Hot Springs, Arkansas.

On April 17, 1987, Smith married Patrice Lively, daughter of jockey John L. Lively, in Hot Springs. The marriage ended in divorce.

Smith served his apprenticeship at Canterbury Downs in Minnesota before moving to New York in 1989. In 2000, he established his home base in Southern California.

On January 13, 2019 Mike married Cynthia Naanouh at a private ceremony at St. Rita's Catholic Church in Sierra Madre, California.

Career
In 1991, Smith became one of the few American jockeys to win a European classic by claiming victory in the Irish 2,000 Guineas aboard Fourstars Allstar (some other American jockeys, notably Steve Cauthen and Cash Asmussen, had won European classics before Smith, but were based in Europe). Also that year he got his big break by becoming leading jockey in New York for the first of three years from 1991 to 1993, with 330, 297 and 313 wins, respectively. The following year, he rode his first Breeders' Cup winner, Lure, in the Breeders' Cup Mile.

The year after that, 1993, Smith truly arrived as a top jockey, setting a North American record for stakes wins in a year with 62. Among his highlights were a win in the Preakness aboard Prairie Bayou- who was later euthanized after breaking down in the Belmont Stakes while being ridden by Smith – and a successful defense of the Breeders' Cup Mile aboard Lure. That year, he won his first Eclipse Award for Outstanding Jockey, and also won an ESPY Award as top jockey. In 1994, he broke his own record for stakes wins with 68, 20 of them Grade I races. Several of those wins came while riding that year's Eclipse Award for Horse of the Year winner, Holy Bull. He also rode two winners in that year's Breeders' Cup, and again won the Eclipse Award as leading jockey. Smith went on to ride two Breeders' Cup winners in both 1995 and 1997.

In 1994, he was voted the Mike Venezia Memorial Award for "extraordinary sportsmanship and citizenship".

The dangers of Smith's profession became evident in 1998, when he suffered major injuries in two separate spills. A broken shoulder in March took him out of action for two months. Then, in August, while leading the Saratoga meeting, he broke two vertebrae in his back, requiring him to wear a body cast for several months. He came back six months after the fall.

In 2000, he moved his home base from New York to Southern California. That year he won the George Woolf Memorial Jockey Award that honors a rider whose career and personal conduct exemplify the very best example of participants in the sport of thoroughbred racing. In 2002, he served as the regular rider for his second Horse of the Year, Azeri. He rode Azeri to a win in the Breeders' Cup Distaff, and also rode Vindication to a win in the Breeders' Cup Juvenile.

In 2005, he rode 50–1 longshot Giacomo to victory in the Kentucky Derby. The win, Smith's first in the Derby, was something of a vindication for him. He was aboard Giacomo's sire Holy Bull, the 2–1 favorite in the 1994 Derby, but could finish only 12th after Holy Bull was bumped coming out of the starting gate.

In 2008, he added two more Breeders' Cup victories first in the Breeders' Cup Juvenile Fillies with Stardom Bound, and with the then 4-year-old Zenyatta in the Ladies' Classic. A year later, Smith returned to the Breeders' Cup with Zenyatta, this time to capture the Breeders' Cup Classic. Smith partnered Zenyatta to 16 straight victories of a 19-for-20 career that saw her become the first horse to win two different Breeders' Cup races, and the richest female racehorse with the earnings of $7,304,580.

After capturing the Breeders' Cup Ladies Classic on Royal Delta in 2011, Smith became the all-time leader for most Breeders' Cup wins, with 17.  By 2016, his record rose to 25 Breeders' Cup wins. 

Smith was inducted into the National Museum of Racing and Hall of Fame in 2003. Smith is one of the jockeys featured in Animal Planet's 2009 reality documentary, Jockeys.

Mike Smith earned the 5,000th victory of his Hall of Fame career when he teamed with 2011 sprint champion Amazombie to capture the $150,000 Potrero Grande Stakes (gr. II) at Santa Anita Park on April 7, 2012.

As he became older, Smith chose to ride fewer but more lucrative races, and his success in doing so, particularly his ability to stay calm in the most high-pressure races, earned him the nickname "Big Money Mike".  In 2017, Smith became the 14th winner of the Laffit Pincay Jr. Award given by the Hall of Fame jockey it is named for. Recipients are given the award for having served the sport of horse racing "with integrity, extraordinary dedication, determination, and distinction." "When we started this award back in 2004, Mike Smith was absolutely the sort of person we had in mind as one of our winners," Pincay said. "I only got to ride against him briefly out here, but I've followed his career over the years and he's been a model of consistency, class, and pure athletic ability. He's a star in all senses of the word and it is an honor to honor him."

In 2018, Smith became the rider of Justify, who, after winning two races with the horse in California, won the 2018 Kentucky Derby.  In doing so, the horse broke the 136-year-old "curse of Apollo" by winning the Kentucky Derby without having raced at 2 years of age. The last time this feat was accomplished was by Apollo in the 1882 race.

Two weeks later, Justify and Smith won the 2018 Preakness Stakes and then, on June 9th, 2018, at the 150th Belmont Stakes, Justify, ridden by Smith, became the 13th Triple Crown winner.  In doing so, Smith, at age 52, became the oldest jockey to win a Triple Crown.

On December 28, 2019, Mike Smith surpassed Jerry Bailey for most grade 1 wins by a jockey with 217 wins.

Year-end charts

References

External links

Bio at NTRA.com
Profile at National Museum Of Racing And Hall Of Fame

American jockeys
Eclipse Award winners
American Champion jockeys
United States Thoroughbred Racing Hall of Fame inductees
People from Chaves County, New Mexico
1965 births
Living people
American horse racing announcers
American people of Spanish descent
Sportspeople from New Mexico